Cosmetalepas africana is a species of sea snail, a marine gastropod mollusk in the family Fissurellidae, the keyhole limpets and slit limpets.

Description

The size of the shell varies between 14 mm and 50 mm.

Distribution
This marine species occurs from Cape Agulhas to KwaZulu-Natal, South Africa.

References

External links
 To World Register of Marine Species
 

Fissurellidae
Gastropods described in 1926